Armand Parmentier (born 15 February 1954 in Waregem, West Flanders) is a retired male long-distance runner from Belgium, who represented his native country in the men's marathon at the 1984 Summer Olympics in Los Angeles, California. There he finished in 30th position, clocking 2:18:10. Two years earlier, he won the silver medal in the classic distance at the 1982 European Championships.

Achievements

External links 
  
 sports-reference

1954 births
Living people
Belgian male long-distance runners
Athletes (track and field) at the 1984 Summer Olympics
European Athletics Championships medalists
Olympic athletes of Belgium
People from Waregem
Sportspeople from West Flanders